
Year 477 BC was a year of the pre-Julian Roman calendar. At the time, it was known as the Year of the Consulship of Pulvillus and Lanatus (or, less frequently, year 277 Ab urbe condita). The denomination 477 BC for this year has been used since the early medieval period, when the Anno Domini calendar era became the prevalent method in Europe for naming years.

Events 
 By place 
 Greece 
 The Spartan co-ruler Leotychides and the Athenian leader Themistocles lead a fleet and army to reoccupy northern Greece and to punish the aristocratic family of the Aleuads for having aided the Persians. Leotychides is caught accepting a bribe during the operations in Thessaly.
 Greek maritime cities around the Aegean Sea no longer wish to be under Spartan control and at Delos offer their allegiance, through Aristides, to Athens. They form the Delian League (also known as the Confederacy of Delos) with Cimon as their principal commander.

 Roman Republic 
 Roman forces in a stronghold on the Cremera River are defeated by an army of Veientes from the Etruscan city of Veii in the Battle of the Cremera.

Births

Deaths 
Duke Dao of Qin, ruler of the state of Qin
Emperor Itoku of Japan, according to legend.

References